Laura Jane Whitehorn (born April 1945) is an American activist who participated in the 1983 United States Senate bombing and was imprisoned 14 years in federal prison. In the 1960s, she organized and participated in civil rights and anti-war movements.

Early days
Born in Brooklyn, New York, Whitehorn holds a master's degree from Brandeis University. After working as an organizer for Students for a Democratic Society (SDS), Whitehorn became a member of the Weathermen/The Weather Underground organization in 1969. She traveled with them to Havana, Cuba as part of the organization's instruction in the ideology of Marxism and urban warfare, visiting one of the camps established by Soviet KGB Colonel Vadim Kotchergine.

"The Days of Rage"
On October 6, of that same year, the Weathermen blew up an 1889 commemorative nine-foot bronze statue of a Chicago policeman located in Haymarket Square in Chicago, Illinois, preceding several days of street fighting between protesters and police. According to FBI records, the "Days of Rage" or the "National Action" rapidly degenerated into destructive riots and open confrontations with Chicago Police, leaving a vast amount of public property destroyed, including 100 shattered windows in the vicinity. The Weather Underground Organization (WUO) made a number of demands, primarily related to the Vietnam War. Whitehorn, along with approximately 55 other people, was arrested for her participation in the violence. A Federal Grand Jury in Chicago later returned a number of indictments charging WUO members with violation of Federal Antiriot Laws. The Antiriot Law charges were dropped in January 1974.

Townhouse explosion
The March 6, 1970 Greenwich Village townhouse explosion was a culmination of the political direction in which Weatherman had been headed, according to Whitehorn. "We were out of touch with what was going on, and we lost sight of the fact that if you're a revolutionary, the first thing you have to try to do is preserve human life." Three Weathermen died in the explosion, Terry Robbins, Diana Oughton, and Ted Gold.

Whitehorn said great care was taken during the numerous bombings to ensure that no one would be hurt, including the janitorial staff.

Feminist education
In 1971, Laura Whitehorn helped organize and lead a takeover and occupation of a Harvard University building by nearly 400 women to protest the war in Vietnam and demand a women's center. One of the founders of the Boston/Cambridge Women's School, Whitehorn helped establish the school as an alternative source of feminist education. Operated and taught by a collective of female volunteers until it closed in 1992, Boston/Cambridge Women's School had gained the reputation as the longest running women's school in the United States at the time.

Climate of militancy
The dead end of militancy and violence for their own sake was obvious after the townhouse explosion, says Whitehorn. Events at the 1972 Republican National Convention protest led Whitehorn to question once more the need for militancy, confirming her belief that they should allow for militancy when guided by a political framework, but not militancy for militancy's sake.

Battle of Boston
During the Boston busing crisis, which the WUO referred to as "the Battle of Boston," Whitehorn was among a small group of the Prairie Fire Organizing Committee (PFOC) activists in the Boston area who sat with baseball bats in people's homes, protecting families from local white supremacists who tried to attack with bats, Molotov cocktails and spray-paint. While Whitehorn and other members of the aboveground cadre carried out their vigilance for two years, the WUO engaged in only minor confrontational tactics in response to the Boston crisis.

Prairie Fire Organizing Committee
The Prairie Fire Organizing Committee, of which Whitehorn was a member, planned the Hard Times Conference (with WUO support and leadership) as a way to build a national multiracial coalition. The goal was to bring together a multiracial crowd of more than 2,000 people at the University of Illinois Circle Campus in Chicago, from January 30 to February 1, 1976. The slogan for the conference was "Hard Times are Fighting Times."

Even though attendance far surpassed what the WUO and PFOC had anticipated, the conference became a political disaster. Whitehorn was so nauseated by the politics of the conference that she became physically ill in the middle of it. "I hated it more than anything else I've ever done, she told Nicole Kief in an interview on October 20, 2002. She began to pull away from the WUO.

By the early 1980s, Whitehorn was active in a variety of radical organizations, in addition to the May 19 Communist Organization, including the John Brown Anti-Klan Committee and the Madame Binh Graphics Collective, a radical art group named for Nguyen Thi Binh, the Viet Cong's lead negotiator at the Paris Peace Talks. During this time, Whitehorn worked with subversive movements in Rhodesia, South Africa and Palestine.

Bombings: the May 19 Communist Organization
The May 19 Communist Organization, also known as the May 19th Coalition and the May 19 Communist Movement, was a self-described revolutionary organization formed by splintered-off members of the Weather Underground. Originally known as the New York Chapter of the Prairie Fire Organizing Committee (PFOC), the group was active from 1978 to 1985. Between 1983 and 1985, the group bombed the United States Senate as well as three military installations in the Washington D.C. area and four sites in New York City.

Arrests
On May 11, 1985 group members Marilyn Buck, wanted for her role in the 1981 Brinks armored car robbery, and Linda Sue Evans were arrested in Dobbs Ferry, New York by FBI agents who had trailed them in the hope the pair would lead them to other fugitives. Whitehorn was arrested the same day in a Baltimore apartment rented by Buck and Evans. At the time of the arrests, group members Susan Rosenberg and Timothy Blunk were already under arrest, Rosenberg for explosives and weapons charges connected with the Brinks robbery, Blunk for similar charges. Fugitive group members Alan Berkman and Elizabeth Ann Duke were captured by the FBI 12 days later near Philadelphia; however, Duke jumped bail and disappeared before trial. The case became known as the Resistance Conspiracy Case.

Indictment, plea and sentencing
On May 12, 1988, the seven members of the group under arrest were indicted. The indictment described the goal of the conspiracy as being "to influence, change and protest policies and practices of the United States Government concerning various international and domestic matters through the use of violent and illegal means" and charged the seven with bombing the United States Capitol Building, three military installations in the Washington D.C. area, and four sites in New York City. The military sites bombed were the National War College at Fort McNair, the Washington Navy Yard Computer Center, and the Washington Navy Yard Officers Club. In New York City, the sites bombed were the Staten Island Federal Building, the Israeli Aircraft Industries Building, the South African consulate, and the offices of the Patrolmen's Benevolent Association.

On September 6, 1990 The New York Times reported that Whitehorn, Evans and Buck had agreed to plead guilty to conspiracy and destruction of Government property. Prosecutors agreed to drop bombing charges against Rosenberg, Blunk and Berkman, who were already serving long prison terms (Rosenberg and Blunk 58 years, Berkman 10) for possession of explosives and weapons. Whitehorn also agreed to plead guilty to fraud in the possession of false identification documents found by the FBI in the Baltimore apartment.

At the December 6, 1990 sentencing of Whitehorn and Evans by Federal District Judge Harold H. Greene, in a courtroom packed with supporters, Whitehorn was sentenced to 20 years in prison and Evans to an additional five years after completing a 35-year sentence being served for illegally buying guns. Buck was already serving 17 years on other convictions, and was later sentenced to a 50-year term for the Brinks holdup and other armed robberies.

On August 6, 1999 Whitehorn was released on parole after serving just over 14 years.

Years in prison
During the 14 years Whitehorn served in prison, she directed AIDS education and wrote numerous publications. When asked if her political work ended once she was in prison, she replied that it had consisted basically of three areas: being a political prisoner, organizing and being part of the struggles for justice inside the prisons, and being part of the fight against HIV and AIDS.

Whitehorn lost many friends while she was in prison during some of the worst years of the AIDS epidemic. While Whitehorn served time in a Federal women's prison at Lexington, Kentucky, her father, Nathaniel, "Tanny" Whitehorn died on January 3, 1992. Whitehorn identifies many consequences of being behind bars for fourteen years, including losing someone you love. She notes that not being with them while they are dying, or being able to go to the memorial service afterwards, is just one way families are destroyed by prison.

Life after prison
Since her release from prison in August 1999, Laura Whitehorn has been involved in a wide range of causes, including the release of political prisoners. She has contributed writings and art work to numerous books and articles, and has been a guest speaker at several universities, including an official guest of the African American Studies Department at Duke University in 2003, where she was presented as a human rights activist by Duke faculty. A past Senior Editor with POZ Magazine in New York City, much of her writing has to do with supporting AIDS healthcare providers and empowering patients through publications. Whitehorn is a member of the NY State taskforce on political prisoners, a group dedicated to supporting New York State "political prisoners" from the black liberation movement and anti-imperialist solidarity movement.

Laura Whitehorn appears in the documentary films, OUT: The Making of a Revolutionary, directed by Sonja DeVries, and The Weather Underground, (2002), directed by Sam Green and Bill Siegel, which includes a cast of former Weather Underground Organization members; Bill Ayers, Bernardine Dohrn, Brian Flanagan, David Gilbert, Naomi Jaffe, and Mark Rudd.

Notes

References
 Women's School (Cambridge, Mass.) records. (1971–1992). Archives and Special Collections, Northeastern University Libraries. www.lib.neu.edu/archives/collect/findaids.

1945 births
Living people
People from Brooklyn
Radcliffe College alumni
Brandeis University alumni
American communists
American feminists
Radical feminists
Socialist feminists
Marxist feminists
Members of the Weather Underground
Activists from New York (state)